Phulo Jhano Medical College and Hospital is a tertiary referral Government Medical college. The college is affiliated to Sido Kanhu Murmu University and is recognized by Medical Council of India. The hospital associated with the college is one of the largest hospitals in the Dumka district.

History 
It was established in 2019

Curriculum 
Phulo Jhano Medical College and Hospital, Jharkhand undertakes education and training of students in MBBS courses.

Admissions 
Admission is based on merit through the National Eligibility and Entrance Test. Yearly undergraduate intake was 100 students for 2019.

References

External links 
 http://dumkamedicalcollege.org/

Medical colleges in Jharkhand
Colleges affiliated to Sido Kanhu Murmu University
Educational institutions established in 2019
2019 establishments in Jharkhand
Universities and colleges in Jharkhand